Proxima Centauri d (also called Proxima d) is a exoplanet orbiting the red dwarf star Proxima Centauri, the closest star to the Sun and part of the Alpha Centauri triple star system. The first signs of the exoplanet emerged as a weak 5.15-day signal in radial velocity data taken from the Very Large Telescope during a 2020 study on Proxima b's mass. This signal was formally proposed to be a candidate exoplanet by Faria et al. in a follow-up paper published in February 2022.

Proxima d is a sub-Earth at least one-quarter of the mass of Earth (or twice the mass of Mars), orbiting at roughly  every 5.1 days. It is the least massive and innermost known planet of the Proxima Centauri system. It is the least massive exoplanet detected with the radial velocity method . Proxima d orbits too close to its star to be habitable, and receives about 190% of Earth's irradiation—assuming an Earth-like reflectivity, its equilibrium temperature may reach .

See also 
 List of nearest exoplanets

References 

Exoplanets discovered in 2022
Exoplanets detected by radial velocity
Proxima Centauri